Protocytheridae is a family of crustaceans belonging to the order Podocopida.

Genera:
 Abyssocythereis Schornikov, 1975
 Arculicythere Grekoff, 1963
 Hechticythere Gruendel, 1978
 Kirtonella Bate, 1963
 Pleurocythere Triebel, 1951
 Procytheridea Peterson, 1954
 Protocythere Triebel, 1938
 Pseudohutsonia Wienholz, 1967
 Saxocythere Kemper, 1971

References

Podocopida